The 2020 LendingTree Bowl was a college football bowl game that was played on December 26, 2020, with kickoff at 3:30 p.m. EST (2:30 p.m. local CST) on ESPN. It was the 22nd edition of the LendingTree Bowl, and was one of the 2020–21 bowl games concluding the 2020 FBS football season. Online lending marketplace LendingTree was the game's title sponsor.  It was also the final LendingTree Bowl played at Ladd-Peebles Stadium before the game moved to Hancock Whitney Stadium the following season.

Teams
The 2020 LendingTree Bowl was contested by the Georgia State Panthers, from the Sun Belt Conference, and the Western Kentucky Hilltoppers, from Conference USA. The two teams had met twice previously, with the series tied at 1–1. The teams' last meeting was played in 2017; Georgia State won, 27–17 in the Cure Bowl.

Georgia State

Georgia State of the Sun Belt entered the bowl with an overall record of 5–4 (4–4 in conference play).

Western Kentucky

Western Kentucky of C-USA entered the bowl with a record of 5–6 (4–3 in conference play). They are one of a limited number of teams to enter a bowl game with a losing record.

Game summary

Statistics

References

External links
 Game statistics at statbroadcast.com

LendingTree Bowl
LendingTree Bowl
Georgia State Panthers football bowl games
Western Kentucky Hilltoppers football bowl games
LendingTree Bowl
LendingTree Bowl